Carter Vincent James  Trevisani (born June 15, 1982) is a Canadian-born Italian former professional ice hockey defenceman. Trevisani last played for HC Asiago of the Serie A and was named to play for Italy internationally four times.

Playing career

Junior
Trevisani was recruited to play collegiate hockey for Ohio State University of the Central Collegiate Hockey Association for the 2000-01 season. After only ten games into his freshman year, Carter left Ohio State to play more regularly at the major junior level for the Ottawa 67's of the OHL from 2000-2003. During his tenure with the 67's Trevisani was drafted 244th overall by the Carolina Hurricanes in the 2001 NHL Entry Draft.

Professional
After not catching on with the Hurricanes or any other NHL team, Trevisani went to play in Italy's Serie A first two seasons with A.S. Mastini Varese Hockey and then, beginning in 2005–2006 with A.S. Asiago Hockey.  Trevisani then went on to play in Sweden with Södertälje SK.  At the beginning of the 2007–2008 season Trevisani returned to Italy to play with Hockey Club Junior Milano Vipers.

Trevisani played the 2006–07 season in Sweden.  While in Sweden his team played in the Hockey Allsvenskan Sweden's second highest ice-hockey league.  Upon the completion of the season, Södertälje SK were promoted to the Elitserien, Sweden's highest ice-hockey league, for the 2007–08 season. Failing to get an extension with Södertälje Carter returned to Italy and signed with Milano Vipers for one season before joining Brunico SG for the 2008–09 season on August 18, 2008. After scoring 17 point in 41 games he was again on the move as he returned to previous club HC Asiago on August 31, 2009.

International play
In 1999 Trevisani participated in the Canada Winter Games as a member of the Ontario Under-17 team.  In 2006 Trevisani represented Italy at the 2006 Winter Olympics and continues to play for the Italian National team in various international competitions.

Personal
As a youngster also played golf and basketball.  Trevisani played on the Wilson Golf Tour for four summers.

Post Hockey Career
Having retired from professional hockey, Carter Trevisani now resides in Ottawa, Ontario, Canada with his wife, daughter and son. Since retirement, 

An avid golfer Trevisani has finished top four in several regional golf tournaments and was even featured in ClubLink life magazine.

Career statistics

Regular season and playoffs

International

Awards
Named Rookie for the year with the Kitchener Dutchmen - 1998
Named Greater Ontario Junior Hockey League Defenseman of the Year - 2000
Member of OHL Champion Ottawa 67's - 2000–01
Allsvenskan to Elitserien Promotion with Södertälje SK - 2006–07

References

External links

Södertälje Player Profile

1982 births
Akwesasne Warriors players
Asiago Hockey 1935 players
Canadian people of Italian descent
Carolina Hurricanes draft picks
HC Milano players
HC Pustertal Wölfe players
HC Varese players
Ice hockey people from Ontario
Ice hockey players at the 2006 Winter Olympics
Italian ice hockey defencemen
Living people
Olympic ice hockey players of Italy
Ottawa 67's players
Södertälje SK players
Sportspeople from Hamilton, Ontario